Diceratops  may refer to:

 Syzeuctus (jr synonym Diceratops Förster, 1869), a genus of hymenopteran insect in the subfamily Banchinae
 Nedoceratops (jr synonym Diceratops Lull, 1905),  a controversial genus of ceratopsid dinosaur